Jessica Ehrlich is a democratic analyst and attorney specializing in strategic communications and public affairs. She was the Democratic nominee for Florida's 13th congressional district in 2012, losing to long-time incumbent and House Appropriations Committee Chair Bill Young. Ehrlich then became a regular contributor on cable news.

Personal life and education
Jessica D. Ehrlich was born and raised in St. Petersburg, Florida. She attended the Canterbury School of Florida and graduated from Shorecrest Preparatory School. As a child, Ehrlich competed in show jumping competitions and was a nationally ranked equestrian.

Ehrlich graduated from Vanderbilt University and later earned her J.D. from Southern Methodist University Dedman School of Law on a Dean's Merit Scholarship.

Her father, Charles W. Ehrlich, was a prominent attorney in St. Petersburg representing clients such as baseball players Dwight Eugene Gooden and Gary Sheffield. Charles and his family were Holocaust survivors. Her mother, Jacquelyn Ehrlich, is a retired registered nurse and a graduate of the London School of Economics.

Career
Ehrlich has worked for Goldman Sachs, Bloomberg LP, the U.S. House of Representatives, the District of Columbia, Estée Lauder and Cartier. Ehrlich interned in law school for Florida federal judge Elizabeth Kovachevich. Ehrlich worked in the U.S. House of Representatives for both Republican Congressman Clay Shaw and Democratic Congressman Stephen Lynch as Legislative Counsel.  Ehrlich also previously had a private legal practice in St. Petersburg, FL.

Ehrlich ran for Congress in 2012, losing to 21-term incumbent Republican Congressman Bill Young, then the longest serving Republican in Congress and Chair of the House Appropriations Committee. Ehrlich declared to run  again in April 2013 facing Congressman Bill Young. Young died on October 18, 2013. Her candidacy was initially endorsed by EMILY's List, but was rescinded after former Florida CFO Alex Sink announced her candidacy in the race. Ehrlich later dropped out of the race. Sink subsequently lost the special election to Republican David Jolly.

In 2014, Ehrlich began appearing as a Democratic Analyst and Attorney on cable news, in print and on radio. She appeared regularly on FOX News on "The O'Reilly Factor" and "America's Newsroom" as well as on FOX Business.

Ehrlich was recognized by Glamour magazine in 2012 at the Women of the Year Awards and by the Florida Association of Women Lawyers as a Leader in the Law in 2013.

On the issues
Ehrlich supports the DREAM Act. Her candidacy was endorsed by House Democratic Leadership, the New Democrat Coalition, Labor Unions, WUFPAC (Women Under Forty PAC) and Emily's List.

References

External links

 
Profile at Vote FL

Living people
Florida Democrats
Women in Florida politics
Florida lawyers
Dedman School of Law alumni
Vanderbilt University alumni
People from St. Petersburg, Florida
Year of birth missing (living people)
Fox News people